Benzen is a village and Ortschaft in the town of Walsrode in the Heidekreis district, Lower Saxony, north Germany.

Location
The village lies south of the town of Walsrode on the River Böhme in the Lüneburg Heath. Benzen is only separated from Walsrode by a wood.
Northeast of the village runs at a distance of 1 km the B 27 motorway, to the east is the L 190, also 1 km away.

History
The name of the village probably comes from the Old German word Bendeffen, which means Burg or castle. Near the village is the magistrate's stone (Gerichtsstein). At this spot there was a thingstead, at which a court (Holting) met on 17 June 1491 to determine forest rights. The village of Bensenville, Illinois, in the United States, is named after the village.

External links 
Benzen at www.stadt-walsrode.de 
  Street maps of Walsrode parishes 

Villages in Lower Saxony
Walsrode
Heidmark